Otter Lake is an all-sports, 74-acre Oakland County, Michigan lake along the main branch of the Clinton River.

To the north, Otter Lake connects to 19-acre Geneva Lake.

To the south is 458-acre Sylvan Lake, which joins the 74-acre Otter Lake, for a total of 532 acres of lake, making it the seventh largest lake in Oakland County.

The lake lies in Waterford Township, Michigan and is west of Pontiac, Michigan.  It is located south of Voorhies Road, east of Cass Lake Road and west of Telegraph Road.

Otter Lake is named for the North American river otter, which are indigenous to the area.

Fish
Fish in Otter Lake include black crappie, largemouth bass, northern pike, panfish, rock bass, smallmouth bass and walleye.

References

Lakes of Oakland County, Michigan
Lakes of Michigan
Lakes of Waterford Township, Michigan